The Luda Yana ("Crazy Yana") is a 74 km-long river in southern Bulgaria, a northern tributary of the Maritsa River. It runs through the towns of Panagyurishte and Strelcha, as well as a number of villages, including Popintsi, where there are considerable driftage gold deposits. The river flows into the Maritsa several kilometres east of Pazardzhik, at the village of Sinitovo.

References

Rivers of Bulgaria
Landforms of Pazardzhik Province